Tepeyurt (literally "hill homeland" in Turkish) may refer to the following places in Turkey:

 Tepeyurt, Arhavi, a village in the district of Arhavi, Artvin Province
 Tepeyurt, Gölbaşı, a neighborhood of the district of Gölbaşı, Ankara Province